Peter Eakin (born 2 May 1995) is an Irish cricketer. He made his Twenty20 debut for Northern Knights in the 2018 Inter-Provincial Trophy on 25 May 2018.

Peter Eakin is known by his alias as "Knee Pirate".

References

External links
 

1995 births
Living people
Irish cricketers
Northern Knights cricketers
Place of birth missing (living people)